HNK Rijeka are a Croatian professional association football club based in Rijeka, Croatia who compete in the Croatian First Football League. The club was formed in July 1946 as NK Kvarner, and played its first unofficial match on 7 August 1946 against Hajduk Split, winning 2–0. The first goal for the club was scored by Rinaldo Petronio. The first official game was played in the qualifiers for the 1946–47 Yugoslav First League against Unione Sportiva Operaia (Pula), losing 2–1 in Rijeka. Kvarner later won the return leg 4–1 in Pula and qualified for the Yugoslav championship. This article lists various records and statistics related to the club and individual players and managers.

All records and statistics accurate as of 13 November 2022.

Individual records and statistics 
Current players and manager are in bold/italics.

Appearances 
 Most appearances:
 All fixtures
 684,  Srećko Juričić (1974–85)
 Official matches
 351,  Srećko Juričić (1974–85)
 In Yugoslav First League
 293,  Srećko Juričić (1974–85)
 In Croatian First Football League
 196,  Kristijan Čaval (1998–2005, 2010–13)
 196,  Damir Milinović (1994–2001, 2003–04)
 In Yugoslav Cup
 25,  Srećko Juričić (1975–85)
 In Croatian Cup
 34,  Dragan Tadić (1992–95, 2003–07)
 In UEFA competitions
 38,  Zoran Kvržić (2013–15, 2017–20)
 Most appearances in one season:
 All official matches
 52,  Ivan Vargić (2013–14)
 In Yugoslav First League
 35,  Tonči Gabrić (1990–91)
 35,  Dušan Kljajić (1990–91)
 35,  Fabijan Komljenović (1990–91)
 In Croatian First Football League
 36,  Andrej Prskalo (2016–17)
 36,  Marin Tomasov (2015–16)
 In Yugoslav Cup
 8,  Janko Janković (1986–87)
 8,  Igor Jelavić (1986–87)
 8,  Roberto Paliska (1986–87)
 8,  Davor Radmanović (1986–87)
 8,  Borče Sredojević (1986–87)
 In Croatian Cup
 10,  Elvis Brajković (1993–94)
 In UEFA competitions
 12,  Mato Jajalo (2014–15)
 12,  Vedran Jugović (2014–15)
 12,  Andrej Kramarić (2014–15)
 12,  Zoran Kvržić (2014–15)
 12,  Mate Maleš (2013–14)
 12,  Marko Vešović (2017–18)
 12,  Dario Župarić (2017–18)
 Appearances in most seasons:
 In top flight
 12,   Robert Rubčić
 In UEFA competitions
 6,  Zoran Kvržić
 6,  Ivan Tomečak

Other records in the Croatian First Football League 
 Youngest player
 16 years, 345 days,  Filip Braut (25 May 2019 v Slaven Belupo)
 Oldest player
 35 years, 344 days,  Mladen Romić (3 May 1998 v Mladost 127)
 Oldest débutante
 34 years, 290 days,  Elvir Bolić (30 July 2006 v Cibalia)
 Most minutes played
 17,045 minutes,  Damir Milinović (1994–2001, 2003–04)
 Most minutes played (one season)
 3,240 minutes,  Andrej Prskalo (2016–17)
 Most consecutive appearances
 68,  Đoni Tafra (1998–2000)
 Most substituted player
 56,  Anas Sharbini (2005–09, 2013–15)
 Most substituted player (one season)
 20,  Mario Gavranović (2016–17)
 Most used substitute
 61,  Jasmin Samardžić (1992–97, 2003–04)
 Most used substitute (one season)
 24,  Dario Čanađija (2016–17)
 Appearances in most seasons
 10,  Kristijan Čaval (1998–2005, 2010–13)

Other records in the Yugoslav First League 
 Most used substitute
 44,  Valdi Šumberac (1986–91)
 Most used substitute (one season)
 14,  Feriz Ćelović (1982–83)
 Appearances in most seasons
 11,  Damir Desnica (1974–85)

Most appearances 
As of 14 May 2016 (includes only Yugoslav First League and Croatian First Football League matches):

Goals 
 Most goals:
 All league matches
 89,  Boško Bursać (1964–72)
 84,  Bruno Veselica (1954–64)
 78,  Stojan Osojnak (1948–53, 1955–59)
 All official matches (since 1974–75)
 70 in 148 apps,  Ahmad Sharbini (2003–07, 2008–09)
 63 in 284 apps,  Damir Desnica (1974–85)
 60 in 143 apps,  Milan Radović (1976–81)
 55 in 65 apps,  Andrej Kramarić (2013–14)
 In Yugoslav First League
 56 in 123 apps,  Milan Radović (1976–81)
 54 in 251 apps,  Damir Desnica (1974–85)
 41 in 106 apps,  Boško Bursać (1964–69)
 In Yugoslav Second League and lower divisions
 78,  Stojan Osojnak (1948–53, 1955–59)
 48,  Boško Bursać (1969–72)
 46,  Bruno Veselica (1954–58)
 In Croatian First Football League
 54 in 117 apps,  Ahmad Sharbini (2003–07, 2008–09)
 46 in 147 apps,  Admir Hasančić (1994–2000)
 39 in 137 apps,  Anas Sharbini (2005–09, 2013–15)
 In Yugoslav Cup
 5 in 11 apps,  Janko Janković (1985–88)
 5 in 12 apps,  Vladimir Lukarić (1958–69)
 5 in 21 apps,  Damir Desnica (1977–84)
 4 in 8 apps,  Ivan Medle (1958–62)
 4 in 13 apps,  Nenad Gračan (1980–86)
 4 in 15 apps,  Danko Matrljan (1982–87)
 In Croatian Cup
 14 in 24 apps,  Ahmad Sharbini (2003–07, 2008–09)
 11 in 9 apps,  Antonio Čolak (2018–20)
 10 in 6 apps,  Andrej Kramarić (2013–14)
 9 in 9 apps,  Mario Gavranović (2016–17)
 9 in 28 apps,  Siniša Linić (2002–07)
 In UEFA competitions
 8 in 16 apps,  Andrej Kramarić (2013–14)
 7 in 38 apps,  Zoran Kvržić (2013–15, 2017–20)
 6 in 11 apps,  Leon Benko (2013)
 6 in 12 apps,  Mario Gavranović (2016–17)
 In Adriatic derby
 7,  Anas Sharbini
 In Dinamo–Rijeka derby
 7,  Damir Desnica
 In Rijeka–Pula derby
 9,  Antonio Čolak
 Most goals in one season:
 All official matches
 28 in 31 apps,  Andrej Kramarić (2014–15)
 27 in 34 apps,  Andrej Kramarić (2013–14)
 26 in 32 apps,  Milan Radović (1980–81)
 26 in 42 apps,  Tomislav Erceg (2004–05)
 In Yugoslav First League
 26 in 31 apps,  Milan Radović (1980–81)
 19 in 33 apps,  Janko Janković (1986–87)
 17 in 27 apps,  Miodrag Kustudić (1977–78)
 17 in 29 apps,  Miodrag Kustudić (1976–77)
 In Yugoslav Second League
 21,  Stojan Osojnak (1950)
 21,  Boško Bursać (1970–71)
 In Croatian First Football League
 21 in 18 apps,  Andrej Kramarić (2014–15)
 21 in 28 apps,  Ahmad Sharbini (2006–07)
 21 in 30 apps,  Josip Drmić (2021–22)
 20 in 31 apps,  Mladen Mladenović (1993–94)
 20 in 32 apps,  Antonio Čolak (2019–20)
 In Yugoslav Cup
 4 in 8 apps,  Janko Janković (1986–87)
 In Croatian Cup
 10 in 6 apps,  Andrej Kramarić (2013–14)
 7 in 5 apps,  Antonio Čolak (2018–19)
 7 in 5 apps,  Mario Gavranović (2016–17)
 7 in 8 apps,  Tomislav Erceg (2004–05)
 7 in 8 apps,  Siniša Linić (2005–06)
 In UEFA competitions
 7 in 12 apps,  Andrej Kramarić (2014–15)
 6 in 10 apps,  Mario Gavranović (2017–18)
 6 in 11 apps,  Leon Benko (2013–14)
 Most goals in one match:
 In top flight
 5,  Andrej Kramarić (9 November 2014 v Lokomotiva)
 4,  Jakov Puljić (13 April 2019 v Inter Zaprešić)
 In domestic cup
 8,  Andrej Kramarić (9 October 2013 v Zmaj Blato)
 In UEFA competitions
 3,  Damir Desnica (7 November 1979 v  Lokomotíva Košice)
 3,  Leon Benko (18 July 2013 v  Prestatyn Town)
 3,  Adis Jahović (7 August 2014 v  Víkingur)
 3,  Andrej Kramarić (23 October 2014 v  Feyenoord)
 In Adriatic derby
 3,  Davor Vugrinec (22 April 2006)
 3,  Andrej Kramarić (27 July 2014)
 In Dinamo–Rijeka derby
 3,  Tonči Gulin (7 March 1965)
 In Rijeka–Pula derby
 4,  Antonio Čolak (25 July 2020)

Other goalscoring records in Croatian First Football League 
 Youngest goalscorer
 17 years, 60 days,  Dario Smoje (19 November 1995 v Varteks)
 Oldest goalscorer
 34 years, 296 days,  Elvir Bolić (5 August 2006 v Kamen Ingrad)
 Scored in most consecutive matches
 6,  Leon Benko (2012–13)
 5,  Andrej Kramarić (2013–14)
 5,  Ivan Krstanović (2013–14)
 5,  Héber Araujo dos Santos (2017–18)
 Scored in most seasons
 8,  Kristijan Čaval (1999–2005, 2010–12)
 8,  Damir Milinović (1994–2002, 2003–04)
 Most goals scored as a substitute
 11,  Ahmad Sharbini (2003–07)
 Most goals scored as a substitute (one season)
 7,  Ahmad Sharbini (2006–07)
 Most goals scored on début
 2,  Ante Milicic (2 October 1999 v Istra)
 Most goals scored against single opposition
 9,  Antonio Čolak (v Istra 1961)
 9,  Ahmad Sharbini (v Osijek)
 9,  Ahmad Sharbini (v Varteks)
 Fastest goals
 17 seconds,  Mario Gavranović (18 September 2016 v Dinamo Zagreb)
 20 seconds,  Anas Sharbini (15 December 2014 v NK Zagreb)
 24 seconds,  Sandro Klić (10 May 2003 v Šibenik)
 24 seconds,  Marin Leovac (10 August 2014 v RNK Split)
 Most braces
 10,  Ahmad Sharbini (including 4 hat-tricks)
 Most hat-tricks
 4,  Ahmad Sharbini
 Fastest hat-trick
 14 minutes,  Ante Milicic (6 May 2001 v Hrvatski Dragovoljac)
 Fastest four goals
 28 minutes,  Andrej Kramarić (9 November 2014 v Lokomotiva)
 Fastest five goals
 41 minutes,  Andrej Kramarić (9 November 2014 v Lokomotiva)
 Most converted penalties
 9,  Ivan Krstanović (from 9 attempts)
 9,  Damir Kreilach (from 10 attempts)
 7,  Robert Murić (from 8 attempts)
 7,  Radomir Đalović (from 10 attempts)
 Most missed penalties
 3,  Radomir Đalović (from 10 attempts)
 2,  Mario Gavranović (from 2 attempts)
 2,  Jakov Puljić (from 4 attempts)
 2,  Anas Sharbini (from 6 attempts)
 2,  Franko Andrijašević (from 7 attempts)
 Most own goals
 2,  Nino Galović
 2,  Dario Knežević
 Most appearances without scoring (outfield players only)
 148,  Dario Knežević (2002–06, 2012–15)

Other goalscoring records in Yugoslav First League 
 Youngest goalscorer (since 1974–75)
 18 years, 107 days,  Elvis Scoria (22 October 1989 v Spartak Subotica)
 Oldest goalscorer (since 1974–75)
 34 years, 266 days,  Josip Skoblar (7 December 1975 v Željezničar)
 Scored in most consecutive matches
 5,  Bruno Veselica (1963–64)
 5,  Milan Radović (1980–81)
 4,  Predrag Valenčić (1984–85)
 Scored in most seasons
 9,  Damir Desnica (1975–76, 1977–85)
 9,  Vladimir Lukarić (1958–66, 1967–68)
 Fastest goal
 under 10 seconds,  Petar Radaković (29 November 1959 v Sloboda)
 Most braces
 11,  Milan Radović (including 2 hat-tricks)
 Most hat-tricks
 2,  Tonči Gulin
 2,  Milan Radović
 Most appearances without scoring (outfield players only)
 174,  Anđelo Milevoj (1963–69)

Other goalscoring records in UEFA competitions 
 Youngest goalscorer
 20 years, 85 days,  Ivan Močinić (25 July 2013 v  Prestatyn Town)
 Oldest goalscorer
 32 years, 304 days,  Tomislav Erceg (26 August 2004 v  Gençlerbirliği)
 Scored in most seasons
 4,  Zoran Kvržić (2013–16, 2017–18)
 Most converted penalties
 4,  Andrej Kramarić (from 4 attempts)
 Fastest hat-trick
 12 minutes and 27 seconds,  Andrej Kramarić (23 October 2014 v  Feyenoord); second fastest hat-trick in the UEFA Europa League

Landmarks
 First goal:
 In official matches:  Antonio Nori (12 August 1946 v  Unione Sportiva Operaia).
 In Yugoslav First League:  Alcide Flaibani (16 October 1946 v 14. Oktobar Niš).
 In Croatian First Football League:  Zoran Ban (29 February 1992 v Šibenik).
 In Yugoslav Cup:  Uskoković (2 November 1947 v Jedinstvo Čakovec).
 In Croatian Cup:  Davor Černe (7 April 1992 v Hajduk Split).
 In UEFA competitions:  Edmond Tomić (13 September 1978 v  Wrexham).
 At Kantrida:  Jozo Matošić (17 November 1946 v Budućnost).
 At Rujevica:  Marin Leovac (2 August 2015 v Lokomotiva).
 First brace:
 In Yugoslav First League:  Antonio Nori (27 October 1946 v Crvena Lokomotiva).
 In Croatian First Football League:  Dean Ljubančić (2 May 1992 v Istra; scored 3 goals in total).
 In Croatian Cup:  Damir Knežević (14 August 1993 v Budućnost Hodošan).
 First hat-trick:
 In Yugoslav First League:  Ivan Medle (2 April 1961 v Radnički Beograd).
 In Croatian First Football League:  Dean Ljubančić (2 May 1992 v Istra).
 In Croatian Cup:  Siniša Linić (15 November 2005 v Vinogradar; scored 5 goals in total).
 In UEFA competitions:  Damir Desnica (7 November 1979 v  Lokomotíva Košice).
 Last goal:
 In Yugoslav First League:  Matjaž Florijančič (16 June 1991 v Partizan).
 In Yugoslav Cup:  Fabijan Komljenović (21 November 1990 v Hajduk Split).
 At Kantrida:  Roman Bezjak (19 July 2015 v Slaven Belupo).
 100th goal:
 In UEFA competitions:  Alexander Gorgon (23 November 2017 v  AEK Athens)
 1,000th goal:
 In Yugoslav First League:  Mladen Mladenović (2 November 1988 v Velež).
 In Croatian First Football League:  Ivan Krstanović (10 May 2014 v Lokomotiva).
 2,000th goal:
 In top flight:  Leon Benko (17 February 2013 v Dinamo Zagreb).

Top goalscorers 
As of 30 April 2022 (includes only Yugoslav First League and Croatian First Football League matches):

Assists 
Data is for the Croatian First Football League (since 2007–08).
 Most assists
 38,  Anas Sharbini
 Most assists (one season)
 12,  Anas Sharbini (2014–15)
 12,  Marin Tomasov (2015–16)
 11,  Zoran Kvržić (2018–19)
 10,  Josip Brezovec (2012–13)
 10,  Robert Murić (2021–22)
 10,  Domagoj Pavičić (2017–18)
 10,  Jakov Puljić (2018–19)
 9,  Stefan Ristovski (2016–17)
 9,  Anas Sharbini (2013–14)
 9,  Marko Vešović (2016–17)

Goalkeeping 
 Most appearances:
 In Yugoslav First League
 190,  Marijan Jantoljak
 186,  Mauro Ravnić
 119,  Radojko Avramović
 In Croatian First Football League
 176,  Đoni Tafra
 143,  Mladen Žganjer
 95,  Ivan Vargić
 In Yugoslav Cup
 14,  Radojko Avramović
 14,  Mauro Ravnić
 In Croatian Cup
 27,  Mladen Žganjer
 15,  Dragan Žilić
 13,  Velimir Radman
 13,  Ivan Vargić
 In UEFA competitions
 23,  Ivan Vargić
 14,  Andrej Prskalo
 13,  Mauro Ravnić
 12,  Simon Sluga
 Longest run without conceding a goal: 
 In Yugoslav First League
 506 minutes,  Borut Škulj (1975–76)
 445 minutes,  Tonči Gabrić (1989–90)
 In Croatian First Football League
 783 minutes,  Ivan Vargić (2015–16)
 622 minutes,  Mladen Žganjer (1993–94)
 565 minutes,  Ivan Vargić (2015–16)
 514 minutes,  Andrej Prskalo (2016–17)
 Overall record
 917 minutes,  Marijan Jantoljak (1969–70, when the club played in Yugoslav Second League)
 Most clean sheets:
 In Croatian First Football League
 58 in 143 apps,  Mladen Žganjer
 55 in 176 apps,  Đoni Tafra
 45 in 95 apps,  Ivan Vargić
 Most clean sheets in one season:
 In Yugoslav First League
 18 in 35 apps,  Tonči Gabrić (1990–91)
 In Croatian First Football League
 21 in 32 apps,  Ivan Vargić (2015–16)
 21 in 36 apps,  Andrej Prskalo (2016–17)
 Most saved penalties:
 In Croatian First Football League
 3,  Ivan Vargić
 Most goals scored:
 In Yugoslav First League
 9,  Marijan Jantoljak (1959–69)

Disciplinary 
 Most yellow cards:
 In Croatian First Football League
 52,  Dalibor Višković
 In Croatian First Football League (one season)
 14,  Dalibor Višković (1998–99)
 In Croatian Cup
 7,  Daniel Šarić
 Most red cards:
 In Croatian First Football League
 5,  Igor Čagalj
 In Croatian First Football League (one season)
 3,  Igor Čagalj (2007–08)
 3,  Siniša Linić (2006–07)
 3,  Dubravko Pavličić (1993–94)
 In Croatian Cup
 2,  Marin Leovac
 Most appearances without a card:
 In Croatian First Football League
 42,  Sead Seferović
 In Croatian Cup
 27,  Mladen Žganjer
 Most appearances without a red card:
 In Croatian First Football League
 178,  Dragan Tadić

International 
 First capped player for  Yugoslavia
 Vladimir Lukarić and Petar Radaković (Belgrade, 18 June 1961: Yugoslavia 3–2 Morocco)
 First capped player for  Croatia
 Tonči Gabrić (Zagreb, 17 October 1990: Croatia 2–1 USA)
 First Rijeka player to appear at the FIFA World Cup for  Yugoslavia
  Petar Radaković at the 1962 FIFA World Cup
 First Rijeka player to appear at the FIFA World Cup for  Croatia
  Filip Bradarić at the 2018 FIFA World Cup
 First Rijeka player to score a goal at the FIFA World Cup
  Petar Radaković at the 1962 FIFA World Cup (Santiago, 10 June 1962: Yugoslavia 1–0 West Germany)
 First Rijeka player to appear at the UEFA European Championship
  Odise Roshi at the 2016 UEFA Euro
 Most caps with  Yugoslavia while a Rijeka player
 19, Petar Radaković (1961–64)
 10, Miloš Hrstić (1978–82)
 10, Nenad Gračan (1984–86)
 Most goals with  Yugoslavia while Rijeka player
 3, Petar Radaković (1961–64)
 2, Nenad Gračan (1984–86)
 Most caps with  Croatia while Rijeka player
 7, Dubravko Pavličić (1992–94)
 Most goals with  Croatia while Rijeka player
 2, Andrej Kramarić (2014)
 2, Mladen Mladenović (1994)
 2, Anas Sharbini (2014–15)
 Most caps with other national teams while Rijeka player
 30,  Darko Velkovski (2019–22)
 Most goals with other national teams while Rijeka player
 7,  Radomir Đalović (2007–08; 2009–11)
 Most capped players to play for Rijeka
 81,  Andrej Kramarić
 78,  Stefan Ristovski
 71,  Odise Roshi
 51,  Elvir Bolić
 48,  Bekim Balaj
 46,  Nastja Čeh
 45,  Darko Velkovski
 45,  Marko Vešović
 43,  Valeri Bojinov
 37,  Fredi Bobic
 37,  Mario Gavranović
 35,  Boško Balaban
 35,  Josip Drmić
 34,  Georgi Ivanov
 33,  Roman Bezjak
 33,  Sebastjan Cimirotič
 32,  Josip Skoblar
 30,  Daniel Šarić

Homegrown players with most appearances in national team

Participation in major international tournaments by Rijeka players

FIFA World Cup 
 1962 FIFA World Cup 4th place
 Petar Radaković
 1982 FIFA World Cup 16th place
 Miloš Hrstić
 Ive Jerolimov
 2018 FIFA World Cup 
 Filip Bradarić

UEFA Euro 
 UEFA Euro 2016 9th place
 Ivan Vargić
 UEFA Euro 2016 18th place
 Bekim Balaj
 Odise Roshi
 UEFA Euro 2020 23rd place
 Milan Ristovski
 Darko Velkovski

Managerial 
 Most appearances for a manager:
 All official matches
 274,  Matjaž Kek
 161,   Josip Skoblar
 147,  Nenad Gračan
 In Yugoslav First League
 131,  Stojan Osojnak
 125,  Josip Skoblar
 89,  Dragutin Spasojević
 In Croatian First Football League
 201,  Matjaž Kek
 131,  Nenad Gračan
 85,  Elvis Scoria
 In Croatian Cup
 30,  Matjaž Kek
 13,  Elvis Scoria
 10,  Nenad Gračan
 In UEFA competitions
 42,  Matjaž Kek
 8,  Simon Rožman
 6,  Miroslav Blažević
 6,  Nenad Gračan
 6,  Josip Skoblar
 6,  Goran Tomić
 Most wins for a manager:
 All official matches
 164,  Matjaž Kek
 69,  Nenad Gračan
 59,   Josip Skoblar
 In Yugoslav First League
 52,  Stojan Osojnak
 50,  Josip Skoblar
 30,  Dragutin Spasojević
 30,  Mladen Vranković
 In Croatian First Football League
 122,  Matjaž Kek
 62,  Nenad Gračan
 31,  Elvis Scoria
 In Croatian Cup
 25,  Matjaž Kek (Croatian Cup record)
 8,  Elvis Scoria
 7,  Simon Rožman
 In UEFA competitions
 16,  Matjaž Kek
 3,  Simon Rožman
 3,  Goran Tomić
 Youngest manager in Croatian First Football League
 33 years, 19 days,  Elvis Scoria (24 July 2004 v Međimurje)
 Oldest manager in Croatian First Football League
 59 years, 102 days,  Vladimir Lukarić (3 May 1998 v Mladost 127)
 Longest-serving managers (per appointment)
 2,045 days,  Matjaž Kek (27 February 2013 to 6 October 2018)
 1,334 days,  Stojan Osojnak (15 October 1963 to 10 June 1967)
 1,302 days,  Josip Skoblar (22 May 1983 to 14 December 1986)
 Longest-serving manager (all appointments)
 2,045 days,  Matjaž Kek (27 February 2013 to 6 October 2018)

Awards 
Yugoslav First League top goalscorers

Croatian First Football League top goalscorers

Croatian Football Cup top goalscorers

Most assists in the Croatian First Football League (since 2007–08)

Sportske novosti Yellow Shirt award
 Nenad Gračan (1985–86)
 Mladen Mladenović (1993–94)
 Leon Benko (2012–13)
 Franko Andrijašević (2016–17)
 Héber Araujo dos Santos (2017–18)
 Antonio Čolak (2019–20)  

Prva HNL Player of the Year (Tportal)
 Tomislav Erceg (2004)
 Leon Benko (2013)
 Andrej Kramarić (2014)
 Marin Tomasov (2015)
 Franko Andrijašević (2016)

Club records and statistics 
As of 13 November 2022.

Competition appearances
 Yugoslav First League: 29 out of 45 (1946–47, 1958–69, 1974–91).
 Yugoslav Second League: 13 out of 45 (1947–48, 1950–53, 1955–58, 1969–74).
 Croatian First Football League: 32 out of 32 (1992–present). One of four clubs that have participated in all seasons, alongside Dinamo Zagreb, Hajduk Split and Osijek.
 Yugoslav Cup: 36 out of 43.
 Croatian Cup: 32 out of 32 (1992–present).
 UEFA competitions: 22 (1978–80, 1984–85, 1986–87, 1999–2001, 2002, 2004–07, 2008–10, 2013–present).

Final position
 Best position in Yugoslav First League: 4th, 4 times (1964–65, 1965–66, 1983–84, 1986–87).
 Best placed Croatian club: 3 times (1964–65, 1983–84, 1986–87).
 Best position in Yugoslav Second League: Winners, 6 times (1952, 1957–58, 1969–70, 1970–71, 1971–72, 1973–74).
 Best position in Croatian First Football League: Winners (2016–17).
 Best position in Yugoslav Cup: Winners, 2 times (1977–78, 1978–79).
 Best position in Croatian Cup: Winners, 6 times (2004–05, 2005–06, 2013–14, 2016–17, 2018–19, 2019–20).
 Worst position in Yugoslav First League: 17th (1968–69).
 Worst position in Croatian First Football League: 12th (2011–12).

League records and statistics
 In Croatian First Football League:
 Matches played: 1032 (ranked 1st).
 Wins: 466 (ranked 3rd).
 Draws: 268 (ranked 1st).
 Defeats: 298 (ranked 7th).
 Goals scored: 1551 (ranked 3rd).
 Goals conceded: 1170 (ranked 2nd).
 Foreign players: 128 (ranked 2nd).
 In Yugoslav First League:
 Matches played: 898 (ranked 12th).
 Wins: 311 (ranked 12th).
 Draws: 252 (ranked 11th).
 Defeats: 336 (ranked 10th).
 Goals scored: 1083 (ranked 11th).
 Goals conceded: 1163 (ranked 11th).
 Points: 857 (ranked 12th).

Matches and scorelines

Firsts
 Official match
 Kvarner 1–2 Unione Sportiva Operaia, 1946–47 Yugoslav First League qualifiers, 12 August 1946
 In Yugoslav First League
 Kvarner 0–5 Crvena Lokomotiva, 1946–47, 6 October 1946
 In Yugoslav Cup
 Kvarner 4–0 Jedinstvo Čakovec, 1947–48, 2 November 1947
 In Croatian First Football League
 Rijeka 2–0 Šibenik, 1992, 29 February 1992
 In Croatian Cup
 Rijeka 0–0 Hajduk Split, 1992, 24 March 1992
 In UEFA competitions
 Rijeka 3–0  Wrexham, 1978–79 European Cup Winners' Cup, 13 September 1978
 At Kantrida
 Kvarner 2–2 Budućnost, 1946–47, 17 November 1946
 At Rujevica
 Rijeka 3–1 Lokomotiva, 2015–16, 2 August 2015

Lasts
 In Yugoslav First League
 Rijeka 3–0 Partizan, 1990–91, 16 June 1991
 In Yugoslav Cup
 Hajduk Split 1–1 Rijeka, 1990–91, 21 November 1990
 At Kantrida
 Rijeka 3–3 Slaven Belupo, 2015–16, 19 July 2015

Landmarks
 1,000th top flight match
 Croatia Zagreb 3–0 Rijeka, 1994–95, 25 February 1995
 1,000th match in the Croatian First Football League
 Dinamo Zagreb 2–0 Rijeka, 2021–22, 30 January 2022
 1,000th win in official matches
 Rijeka 4–1 Zagreb, 2015–16, 4 October 2015

Biggest wins
 Home:
 In Yugoslav First League
 6–0 v. Novi Sad, 1963–64, 12 April 1964
 In Croatian First Football League
 7–0 v. Zadar, 2002–03, 10 May 2003
 7–0 v. Cibalia, 2017–18, 9 September 2017
 7–0 v. Inter Zaprešić, 2017–18, 13 April 2019
 In lower Yugoslav divisions
 10–0 v. 11 Oktomvri, 1950, 22 October 1950
 In Yugoslav Cup
 5–0 v. Crvena Zastava Kragujevac, 1986–87, 27 August 1986
 In Croatian Cup
 11–0 v. Zmaj Blato, 2013–14, 9 October 2013
 In UEFA competitions
 5–0 v.  Prestatyn Town, 2013–14, 18 July 2013
 Away:
 In Yugoslav First League
 6–2 v. Trešnjevka, 1965–66, 19 June 1966
 5–1 v. Trešnjevka, 1964–65, 23 August 1964
 5–1 v. Sloboda, 1959–60, 29 November 1959
 5–1 v. Budućnost, 1982–83, 15 August 1982
 4–0 v. Velež, 1976–77, 5 June 1977
 In Croatian First Football League
 7–0 v. Istra 1961, 2018–19, 4 May 2019
 In lower Yugoslav divisions
 7–0 v. Grafičar Zagreb, 23 September 1956
 7–0 v. Metalac Zagreb, 27 October 1957
 In Yugoslav Cup
 4–0 v. Viko-Omladinac, 1982–83, 26 October 1982
 In Croatian Cup
 11–0 v. Buje, 2019–20, 1 October 2019
 In UEFA competitions
 5–1 v.  Víkingur, 2014–15, 31 July 2014
 5–1 v.  The New Saints, 2017–18, 18 July 2017

Biggest defeats
 Home:
 In Yugoslav First League
 0–6 v. Vojvodina, 1959–60, 6 September 1959
 In Croatian First Football League
 2–7 v. Dinamo Zagreb, 2022–23, 13 November 2022
 0–5 v. Dinamo Zagreb, 2019–20, 10 November 2019
 In lower Yugoslav divisions
 0–6 v. Zagreb, 1972–73, 5 November 1972
 In Yugoslav Cup
 0–4 v. Mornar Split, 1947, 16 November 1947
 In Croatian Cup
 0–2 v. Zagreb, 1995–96, 20 March 1996
 0–2 v. Orijent, 1997–98, 1 October 1997
 2–4 v. Varaždin, 2010–11, 21 November 2010
 In UEFA competitions
 0–3 v.  Partizan, 1999–2000, 4 August 1999
 0–3 v.  Aberdeen, 2015–16, 16 July 2015
 1–4 v.  Austria Wien, 2017–18, 2 November 2017
 Away:
 In Yugoslav First League
 0–6 v. Dinamo Zagreb, 1958–59, 21 June 1959
 In Croatian First Football League
 0–6 v. Dinamo Zagreb, 2009–10, 20 September 2009
 0–6 v. Segesta, 1995–96, 22 October 1995
 In lower Yugoslav divisions
 0–6 v. Enotnost, 1947–48, 19 October 1947
 0–6 v. Proleter, 1952–53, 5 April 1953
 1–7 v. Maribor, 1972–73, 17 June 1973
 In Yugoslav Cup
 1–8 v. Crvena Zvezda, 1952, 5 October 1952
 In Croatian Cup
 0–5 v. Zagreb, 1995–96, 6 March 1996
 In UEFA competitions
 0–4 v.  Vitória, 2013–14, 19 September 2013

Highest scoring draws
 In Yugoslav First League
 Rijeka 3–3 Partizan (1958–59, 29 March 1959)
 Rijeka 3–3 NK Zagreb (1977–78, 19 March 1978)
 Rijeka 3–3 Osijek (1978–79, 25 March 1979)
 Dinamo Zagreb 3–3 Rijeka (1983–84, 25 March 1984)
 Rijeka 3–3 Velež (1985–86, 27 October 1985)
 In Croatian First Football League
 Rijeka 4–4 Cibalia (1995–96, 27 August 1995)
 Rijeka 4–4 Inter Zaprešić (1995–96, 15 October 1995)
 Zadar 4–4 Rijeka (2011–12, 11 September 2011)
 In domestic cups
 Hajduk Split 3–3 Rijeka (1993–94, 27 April 1994)
 In UEFA competitions
 Rijeka 2–2  Omonia (2006–07, 13 July 2006)
  Stuttgart 2–2 Rijeka (2013–14, 29 August 2013)
 Rijeka 2–2  Sevilla (2014–15, 2 October 2014)
  Aberdeen 2–2 Rijeka (2015–16, 23 July 2015)
 Rijeka 2–2  İstanbul Başakşehir (2016–17, 4 August 2016)
  AEK Athens 2–2 Rijeka (2017–18, 23 November 2017)

Highest scoring matches
 In Yugoslav First League
 Rijeka 6–3 Radnički Beograd (1960–61, 2 April 1961)
 NK Zagreb 3–6 Rijeka (1980–81, 31 August 1980)
 Rijeka 5–4 Radnički Niš (1981–82, 23 August 1981)
 Rijeka 6–3 Dinamo Vinkovci (1982–83, 4 June 1983)
 In Croatian First Football League
 Istra 1961 3–6 Rijeka (2021–22, 2 October 2021)
 Rijeka 2–7 Dinamo Zagreb (2022–23, 13 November 2022)
 In Yugoslav Cup
 Crvena Zvezda 8–1 Rijeka (1952, 5 October 1952)
 In Croatian Cup
 Rijeka 11–0 Zmaj Blato (2013–14, 9 October 2013)
 Buje 0–11 Rijeka (2019–20, 1 October 2019)
 In UEFA competitions
  Valletta 4–5 Rijeka (2000–01, 24 August 2000)

Records and statistics by season

Points
First division (Yugoslav First League and Croatian First Football League) only.
 Most points in one season:
 3 pts for a win: 88 in 36 matches (2016–17).
 2 pts for a win: 42 in 34 matches (1983–84).
 Highest percentage of points in one season:
 3 pts for a win: 81.5% (2016–17).
 2 pts for a win: 65.0% (1992–93).
 Fewest points in one season:
 3 pts for a win: 33 in 32 matches (2000–01, 2002–03).
 2 pts for a win: 18 in 22 matches (1959–60).
 Lowest percentage of points in one season:
 3 pts for a win: 34.4% (2000–01, 2002–03).
 2 pts for a win: 33.8% (1968–69).

Matches
 Most matches played in one season:
 Overall: 56 (2013–14).
 In Yugoslav First League: 36 (1990–91).
 In Croatian First Football League: 36 (1995–96, 2013–14, 2014–15, 2015–16, 2016–17, 2017–18, 2018–19, 2019–20, 2020–21, 2021–22).
 In Yugoslav Cup: 8 (1986–87).
 In Croatian Cup: 10 (1993–94).
 In UEFA competitions: 12 (2013–14, 2014–15, 2017–18).
 Fewest matches played in one season:
 Overall: 18 (1952).
 In Yugoslav First League: 22 (1958–59, 1959–60, 1960–61, 1961–62).
 In Croatian First Football League: 22 (1992).

Wins
 Most wins in one season:
 All official fixtures
 35 in 55 matches (2014–15)
 33 in 44 matches (2016–17)
 Highest percentage of fixtures (top flight only)
 75.0% (2016–17)
 In Yugoslav First League
 16 in 34 matches (1983–84)
 14 in 28 matches (1964–65)
 Home
 14 in 17 matches (1983–84)
 Away
 5 in 15 matches (1965–66)
 5 in 17 matches (1988–89)
 In Croatian First Football League
 27 in 36 matches (2016–17)
 Home
 17 in 18 matches (2016–17)
 Away
 10 in 16 matches (1998–99, 2005–06)
 10 in 18 matches (2013–14, 2016–17, 2020–21)
 In Yugoslav Cup
 5 in 5 matches (1977–78)
 In Croatian Cup
 7 in 8 matches (2013–14)
 6 in 6 matches (2016–17)
 5 in 5 matches (2018–19)
 5 in 5 matches (2019–20)
 In UEFA competitions
 8 in 12 matches (2014–15)
 Fewest wins in one season: 
 All official fixtures
 6 (1947–48, 1961–62)
 Lowest percentage of fixtures (top flight only)
 22.7% (1961–62)
 In Yugoslav First League
 5 in 22 matches (1961–62)
 Home
 3 in 11 matches (1961–62)
 6 in 17 matches (1975–76)
 Away
 0 in 17 matches (1974–75)
 In Croatian First Football League
 8 in 30 matches (1994–95)
 Home
 4 in 16 matches (2000–01)
 Away
 0 in 16 matches (2002–03)

Defeats
 Most defeats in one season: 
 All official fixtures
 21 (1968–69)
 Highest percentage of fixtures (top flight only)
 58.8% (1968–69)
 In Yugoslav First League
 20 in 34 matches (1968–69)
 Home
 5 in 17 matches (1968–69)
 4 in 11 matches (1959–60)
 Away
 15 in 17 matches (1968–69)
 In Croatian First Football League
 17 in 32 matches (2000–01, 2002–03)
 17 in 36 matches (1995–96)
 Home
 7 in 16 matches (2000–01)
 6 in 15 matches (1994–95)
 6 in 9 matches (2022–23)
 Away
 12 in 16 matches (2002–03)
 12 in 18 matches (1995–96)
 In domestic cups
 2 (7 times)
 In UEFA competitions
 5 in 12 matches (2017–18)
 Fewest defeats in one season:
 All official fixtures
 1 (1969–70)
 2 in 44 matches (2016–17)
 Lowest percentage of fixtures (top flight only)
 2.8% (2015–16)
 In Yugoslav First League
 5 in 22 matches (1961–62)
 8 in 34 matches (1983–84)
 Home
 0 in 17 matches (1976–77, 1979–80, 1983–84)
 Away
 2 in 11 matches (1961–62)
 In Croatian First Football League
 1 in 36 matches (2015–16)
 Home
 0 in 18 matches (2013–14, 2015–16, 2016–17)
 0 in 16 matches (1997–98, 2004–05)
 0 in 15 matches (1992–93)
 Away
 1 in 18 matches (2015–16)

Draws
 Most draws in one season:
 All official fixtures
 20 in 44 matches (1993–94)
 Highest percentage of fixtures (top flight only)
 54.5% (1961–62)
 In Yugoslav First League
 14 in 34 matches (1987–88)
 12 in 22 matches (1961–62)
 Home
 9 in 17 matches (1987–88)
 Away
 8 in 17 matches (1977–78, 1985–86)
 7 in 11 matches (1961–62)
 In Croatian First Football League
 17 in 34 matches (1993–94)
 Home
 8 in 16 matches (1997–98)
 8 in 17 matches (1993–94)
 Away
 9 in 17 matches (1993–94)
 In domestic cups
 5 in 8 matches (1986–87)
 In UEFA competitions
 6 in 12 matches (2013–14)
 Fewest draws in one season: 
 All official fixtures
 1 (1948–49, 1952)
 Lowest percentage of fixtures (top flight only)
 9.1% (1960–61)
 In Yugoslav First League
 2 in 22 matches (1960–61)
 Home
 1 in 14 matches (1964–65)
 Away
 0 in 11 matches (1960–61)
 1 in 17 matches (1968–69, 1979–80)
 In Croatian First Football League
 4 in 36 matches (2017–18)
 4 in 32 matches (1998–99)
 Home
 1 in 18 matches (2016–17, 2017–18)
 1 in 17 matches (2008–09)
 Away
 0 in 16 matches (2005–06)

Goals scored
 Most goals scored in one season:
 All official fixtures
 117 in 55 matches (2014–15)
 Highest average per match (top flight only)
 2.11 (2014–15)
 In Yugoslav First League
 53 in 34 matches (1983–84)
 47 in 28 matches (1964–65)
 Home
 36 in 17 matches (1983–84)
 34 in 14 matches (1964–65)
 Away
 20 in 17 matches (1980–81)
 19 in 15 matches (1965–66)
 18 in 11 matches (1959–60)
 In Croatian First Football League
 76 in 36 matches (2014–15)
 Home
 56 in 18 matches (2014–15)
 Away
 36 in 18 matches (2021–22)
 In domestic cups
 22 in 8 matches (2005–06)
 19 in 6 matches (2016–17)
 18 in 5 matches (2018–19)
 18 in 5 matches (2019–20)
 In UEFA competitions
 23 in 12 matches (2014–15)
 Fewest goals scored in one season: 
 All official fixtures
 20 in 24 matches (1961–62)
 Lowest average per match (top flight only)
 0.73 (1994–95)
 In Yugoslav First League
 17 in 22 matches (1961–62)
 29 in 34 matches (1989–90)
 Home
 9 in 11 matches (1961–62)
 Away
 8 in 17 matches (1974–75)
 8 in 11 matches (1961–62)
 In Croatian First Football League
 22 in 30 matches (1994–95)
 Home
 12 in 15 matches (1994–95)
 Away
 8 in 11 matches (1992)
 10 in 16 matches (1997–98)

Goals conceded
 Fewest goals conceded in one season:
 All official fixtures
 11 in 30 matches (1969–70)
 Lowest average per match (top flight only)
 0.56 (2015–16)
 In Yugoslav First League
 21 in 22 matches (1961–62)
 25 in 36 matches (1990–91)
 Home
 3 in 18 matches (1990–91)
 Away
 8 in 11 matches (1961–62)
 In Croatian First Football League
 20 in 36 matches (2015–16)
 Home
 4 in 11 matches (1992)
 5 in 15 matches (1992–93)
 Away
 11 in 18 matches (2015–16)
 Most goals conceded in one season: 
 All official fixtures
 68 in 42 matches (2006–07)
 Highest average per match (top flight only)
 2.36 (1959–60)
 In Yugoslav First League
 54 in 34 matches (1981–82)
 52 in 22 matches (1959–60)
 Home
 21 in 13 matches (1963–64)
 19 in 11 matches (1959–60)
 Away
 40 in 17 matches (1968–69, 1979–80)
 In Croatian First Football League
 56 in 36 matches (1995–96)
 53 in 33 matches (2006–07)
 Home
 23 in 16 matches (2006–07)
 23 in 18 matches (2021–22)
 23 in 18 matches (1995–96)
 Away
 33 in 18 matches (1995–96)
 31 in 16 matches (2008–09)
 In domestic cups
 10 in 6 matches (1995–96)
 10 in 8 matches (2004–05)
 In UEFA competitions
 17 in 12 matches (2017–18)

Goal difference
 Best league goal difference in one season: 
 In Yugoslav First League
 +17 in 28 matches (1964–65)
 Home
 +28 in 17 matches (1983–84)
 Away
 0 in 11 matches (1961–62)
 In Croatian First Football League
 +48 in 36 matches (2016–17)
 Home
 +44 in 18 matches (2014–15)
 Away
 +15 in 18 matches (2016–17)
 Worst league goal difference in one season: 
 In Yugoslav First League
 –22 in 22 matches (1959–60)
 Home
 –7 in 11 matches (1959–60)
 Away
 –30 in 17 matches (1968–69)
 In Croatian First Football League
 –14 in 32 matches (2000–01)
 Home
 –1 in 15 matches (1994–95, 2010–11)
 Away
 –22 in 18 matches (1995–96)

Disciplinary
Croatian First Football League only.
 Yellow cards:
 Most (total): 90 in 36 matches (2015–16).
 Fewest (total): 29 in 22 matches (1992).
 Most (average per match): 2.719 (1998–99).
 Fewest (average per match): 1.318 (1992).
 Red cards:
 Most (total): 10 in 32 matches (2000–01).
 Fewest (total): 0 in 32 matches (2004–05).
 Most (average per match): 0.313 (2000–01).
 Fewest (average per match): 0.000 (2004–05).

Sequences and runs
Currently active sequences are in bold/italics.

Goals
 Longest streak without conceding a goal: 
 In Yugoslav First League: 506 minutes (11 Apr 1976 to 6 Jun 1976).
 In Croatian First Football League: 783 minutes (2 Aug 2015 to 4 Oct 2015).
 Home: 672 minutes (13 Jun 1992 to 15 Nov 1992).
 Away: 524 minutes (12 Apr 1995 to 10 Sep 1995).
 In Yugoslav Cup: 576 minutes (29 Mar 1978 to 16 May 1979).
 In Croatian Cup: 510 minutes (1 Jun 1994 to 8 Mar 1995).
 In UEFA competitions: 410 minutes (7 Nov 2013 to 24 Jul 2014).
 All official matches:
 Seasons in top flight: 873 minutes (2 Aug 2015 to 4 Oct 2015).
 Seasons in Yugoslav Second League: 917 minutes (1969–70).
 Longest streak without scoring a goal:
 In Yugoslav First League: 515 minutes (27 Mar 1988 to 1 May 1988).
 In Croatian First Football League: 493 minutes (14 Feb 2021 to 12 Mar 2021).
 Home: 448 minutes (23 Oct 2010 to 9 Apr 2011).
 Away: 518 minutes (10 Sep 1995 to 11 Nov 1995).
 In Yugoslav Cup: at least 180 minutes (2 times).
 In Croatian Cup: 339 minutes (24 Oct 2001 to 17 Sep 2003).
 In UEFA competitions: 421 minutes (13 Sep 1978 to 3 Oct 1979).
 Longest scoring run:
 In Yugoslav First League: 17 matches (30 Mar 1986 to 7 Sep 1986).
 In Croatian First Football League: 21 matches (27 Apr 2014 to 6 Dec 2014).
 Home: 36 matches (12 Aug 2013 to 2 Aug 2015).
 Away: 15 matches (30 Oct 2004 to 1 Oct 2005).
 In Yugoslav Cup: 6 matches (7 Sep 1977 to 8 Nov 1978).
 In Croatian Cup: 23 matches (17 Sep 2003 to 25 Oct 2006).
 In UEFA competitions: 7 matches (14 Sep 2017 to 16 Aug 2018; 3 Dec 2020 to 26 Aug 2021).
 Longest conceding run:
 In Yugoslav First League: 16 matches (21 Jun 1959 to 17 Apr 1960).
 In Croatian First Football League: 21 matches (6 Apr 2002 to 30 Nov 2002).
 Home: 15 matches (23 Mar 2002 to 22 Mar 2003).
 Away: 19 matches (3 May 2009 to 31 Jul 2010).
 In Yugoslav Cup: 8 matches (2 times).
 In Croatian Cup: 9 matches (14 Mar 2000 to 29 Oct 2003).
 In UEFA competitions: 11 matches (19 Mar 1980 to 14 Sep 2000).

Wins
 Longest winning streak:
 In Yugoslav First League: 5 matches (28 May 1989 to 20 Aug 1989).
 Home: 11 matches (13 Sep 1964 to 29 Aug 1965).
 Away: 2 matches (3 times).
 In Croatian First Football League: 10 matches (31 Oct 1998 to 7 Mar 1999).
 Home: 14 matches (9 Nov 2008 to 12 Sep 2009).
 Away: 5 matches (26 Sep 2021 to 30 Jan 2022).
 In Yugoslav Cup: 6 matches (7 Sep 1977 to 8 Nov 1978).
 Home: 4 matches (13 Oct 1976 to 8 Nov 1978).
 Away: 4 matches (24 Oct 1977 to 24 May 1979).
 In Croatian Cup: 13 matches (26 Sep 2018 to 14 Apr 2021).
 Home: 7 matches (12 Apr 2005 to 13 Mar 2007).
 Away: 9 matches (4 Apr 2018 to 14 Apr 2021).
 In UEFA competitions: 6 matches (17 Jul 2014 to 18 Sep 2014).
 Home: 3 matches (4 times).
 Away: 3 matches (24 Jul 2014 to 28 Aug 2014).
 Longest winning streak (all official matches): 
 Seasons in top flight: 16 matches, including 8 league, 5 European and 3 domestic cup matches (2 May 2014 to 24 Aug 2014).
 Home: 16 matches (1 Mar 2014 to 21 Sep 2014).
 Away: 8 matches (21 Sep 2021 to 30 Jan 2022).
 Longest winning streak (one or two-legged knock-out ties):
 In Yugoslav Cup: 10 ties (7 Sep 1977 to 24 May 1979).
 In Croatian Cup: 13 ties (22 Sep 2004 to 29 Nov 2006; 26 Sep 2018 to 14 Apr 2021).
 In UEFA competitions: 6 ties (18 Jul 2013 to 28 Aug 2014).
 In all knock-out competitions: 16 ties (18 Jul 2013 to 4 Mar 2015).

Unbeaten
 Longest unbeaten run:
 In Yugoslav First League: 13 matches (20 Oct 1985 to 27 Apr 1986).
 Home: 43 matches (20 Nov 1982 to 23 Jun 1985).
 Away: 6 matches (18 Mar 1984 to 9 Aug 1984).
 In Croatian First Football League: 44 matches (21 Feb 2016 to 6 May 2017).
 Home: 53 matches (21 Sep 2014 to 11 Aug 2017).
 Away: 21 matches (21 Feb 2016 to 6 May 2017).
 In Yugoslav Cup: 14 matches (1 Dec 1976 to 7 Nov 1981).
 Home: 8 matches (13 Oct 1976 to 27 Apr 1983).
 Away: 7 matches (26 Oct 1977 to 7 Nov 1981).
 In Croatian Cup: 16 matches (7 Apr 2004 to 3 May 2006).
 Home: 15 matches (7 Dec 2001 to 24 Nov 2010).
 Away: 9 matches (4 Apr 2018 to 14 Apr 2021).
 In UEFA competitions: 9 matches (7 Nov 2013 to 18 Sep 2014). 
 Home: 12 matches (18 Jul 2013 to 16 Jul 2015).
 Away: 4 matches (12 Dec 2013 to 18 Sep 2014; 11 Dec 2014 to 16 Aug 2017; 26 Nov 2020 to current).
 Longest unbeaten run (all official matches):
 Seasons in top flight: 45 matches (5 Apr 2016 to 6 May 2017); second longest run in European football.
 Home: 44 matches (16 Jul 2015 to 11 Aug 2017).
 Away: 23 matches (5 Apr 2016 to 6 May 2017).
 Seasons in lower divisions: 32 matches (31 Aug 1969 to 6 Sep 1970).
 Home: 39 matches (25 Mar 1973 to 19 Jun 1975).
 Away: 26 matches (24 Aug 1969 to 17 Mar 1971).

Winless
 Longest streak without a win:
 In Yugoslav First League: 10 matches in 1959, 1961–62 and 1978–79.
 Home: 6 matches (15 Oct 1961 to 26 Aug 1962).
 Away: 30 matches (30 Oct 1968 to 13 Sep 1975).
 In Croatian First Football League: 10 matches (16 Jul 2022 to 9 Oct 2022).
 Home: 8 matches (8 Nov 2020 to 21 Mar 2021).
 Away: 22 matches (14 Apr 2002 to 25 Oct 2003).
 In Yugoslav Cup: 4 matches in 1961–65 and 1987–89.
 Home: 2 matches (2 times).
 Away: 11 matches (2 Dec 1959 to 26 Oct 1977).
 In Croatian Cup: 4 matches in 2001–03.
 Home: 4 matches (25 Oct 1996 to 29 Oct 2003).
 Away: 4 matches (31 Aug 1993 to 7 Sep 1994).
 In UEFA competitions: 7 matches in 2013–14.
 Home: 4 matches (11 Jul 2017 to 7 Dec 2017).
 Away: 9 matches (27 Sep 1978 to 24 Aug 2000).

Defeats
 Longest losing streak:
 In Yugoslav First League: 6 matches in 1959 and 1968.
 Home: 4 matches (14 Jun 1959 to 6 Dec 1959).
 Away: 8 matches (3 times).
 In Croatian First Football League: 7 matches (28 Sep 2002 to 16 Nov 2002).
 Home: 3 matches (3 times).
 Away: 8 matches (14 Apr 2002 to 9 Nov 2002).
 In Yugoslav Cup: 4 matches in 1962–66.
 Home: 2 matches (8 Apr 1959 to 27 Feb 1966).
 Away: 11 matches (2 Dec 1959 to 26 Oct 1977).
 In Croatian Cup: 3 matches (2 times).
 Home: 4 matches (20 Mar 1996 to 7 Dec 2001).
 Away: 2 matches (3 times).
 In UEFA competitions: 4 matches (16 Aug 2017 to 28 Sep 2017; 22 Oct 2020 to 26 Nov 2020).
 Home: 3 matches (22 Aug 2017 to 7 Dec 2017).
 Away: 7 matches (30 Jun 2002 to 6 Aug 2009).

Draws
 Longest drawing streak:
 In Yugoslav First League: 5 matches (1 Nov 1987 to 6 Dec 1987).
 Home: 4 matches (2 times).
 Away: 5 matches (20 Oct 1985 to 27 Apr 1986).
 In Croatian First Football League: 4 matches (5 times).
 Home: 4 matches (4 times).
 Away: 5 matches (2 times).
 In Yugoslav Cup: 2 matches in 1979–80 and 1986–87.
 Home: 1 match (4 times).
 Away: 3 matches (2 times).
 In Croatian Cup: 3 matches in 2008.
 Home: 2 matches (13 Mar 2007 to 12 Nov 2008).
 Away: 2 matches (29 Oct 2008 to 26 Nov 2008).
 In UEFA competitions: 3 matches in 2013 and 2015–16.
 Home: 3 matches (3 Oct 2013 to 28 Nov 2013).
 Away: 2 matches (4 times).
 Longest streak without a draw:
 In Yugoslav First League: 15 matches (20 Apr 1988 to 2 Oct 1988).
 Home: 11 matches (13 Sep 1964 to 29 Aug 1965).
 Away: 16 matches (20 May 1979 to 5 Jun 1980).
 In Croatian First Football League: 23 matches (16 Aug 1998 to 2 May 1999).
 Home: 16 matches (21 Sep 2008 to 12 Sep 2009).
 Away: 25 matches (21 May 2005 to 24 Feb 2007).
 In Yugoslav Cup: 16 matches in 1952–67.
 Home: 9 matches (16 May 1979 to 19 Nov 1986).
 Away: 21 matches (11 Nov 1951 to 24 May 1979).
 In Croatian Cup: 24 matches (26 Nov 2008 to 22 Apr 2015).
 Home: 14 matches (15 Jun 1994 to 8 Mar 2005).
 Away: 38 matches (26 Nov 2008 to 19 oct 2022).
 In UEFA competitions: 8 matches (21 Jun 2008 to 8 Aug 2013).
 Home: 9 matches (5 Mar 1980 to 13 Jul 2006).
 Away: 8 matches (14 Sep 2000 to 8 Aug 2013).

Longest sequences and runs against single opposition in the Croatian First Football League
 Longest winning streak
 Overall: 9 matches v. Istra 1961.
 Home: 11 matches v. Lokomotiva and Osijek.
 Away: 7 matches v. Inter Zaprešić (current).
 Longest unbeaten run
 Overall: 31 matches v. Slaven Belupo.
 Home: 26 matches v. Istra 1961.
 Away: 14 matches v. Slaven Belupo.
 Longest streak without a win
 Overall: 11 matches v. Dinamo Zagreb and Hajduk Split.
 Home: 6 matches v. Osijek.
 Away: 11 matches v. Dinamo Zagreb and Osijek.
 Longest losing streak
 Overall: 10 matches v. Hajduk Split.
 Home: 5 matches v. Hajduk Split (current).
 Away: 9 matches v. Osijek.
 Longest drawing streak
 Overall: 8 matches v. Cibalia.
 Home: 4 matches v. Cibalia.
 Away: 5 matches v. Cibalia and Slaven Belupo.
 Longest streak without a draw
 Overall: 24 matches v. Lokomotiva.
 Home: 15 matches v. Osijek.
 Away: 16 matches v. Dinamo Zagreb and Hajduk Split.

Opponents and familiarity
 Club played most often:
 All official matches
 175 times v.   Dinamo Zagreb
 In domestic leagues
 153 times v.   Hajduk Split
 In domestic cups
 24 times v.   Dinamo Zagreb
 In UEFA competitions
 4 times v.  Standard Liège (1986–87, 2014–15)
 4 times v.  Aberdeen (2015–16, 2019–20)
 In one season
 7 times v.  Hajduk Split (2005–06)
 7 times v.  Dinamo Zagreb (2014–15)
 Non-home ground Rijeka have played on most often:
 94 times at Maksimir (88 times v.   Dinamo Zagreb, 6 times v.  Lokomotiva)
 Player who has scored the most goals against Rijeka:
 In Yugoslav First League
 13,  Slaven Zambata (with Dinamo Zagreb)
 In Croatian First Football League
 13,  El Arabi Hillel Soudani (with Dinamo Zagreb)
 In Croatian Cup
 3,  Zoran Kvržić (with Osijek)
 3,  Nikola Šafarić (with Varteks)
 In UEFA competitions
 3,  Gilbert Agius (with  Valletta)
 In Adriatic derby
 10,  Mijo Caktaš
 In Dinamo–Rijeka derby
 14,  El Arabi Hillel Soudani
 In Rijeka–Pula derby
 4,  Gedeon Guzina

Records and statistics against major rivals
As of 13 November 2022.

v. Hajduk Split

 Extreme wins and defeats:
 Home win:
 In Yugoslav First League
 4–0, 1962–63, 9 September 1962
 In Croatian First Football League
 4–0, 2007–08, 22 September 2007 
 Away win:
 In Yugoslav First League
 3–1, 1975–76, 13 September 1975
 2–0, 1962–63, 24 March 1963
 In Croatian First Football League
 4–0, 2005–06, 22 April 2006
 4–0, 2019–20, 1 December 2019
 Home defeat:
 In Yugoslav First League
 1–4, 1974–75, 29 June 1975
 In Croatian First Football League
 0–3, 1995–96, 17 February 1996
 0–3, 2011–12, 21 March 2012
 0–3, 2021–22, 8 May 2022
 Away defeat:
 In Yugoslav First League
 2–6, 1958–59, 7 June 1959
 0–4, 1959–60, 13 September 1959
 0–4, 1965–66, 24 October 1965
 0–4, 1988–89, 28 May 1989
 In Croatian First Football League
 0–4, 2003–04, 28 February 2004
 0–4, 2018–19, 20 April 2019
 Longest winning streak
 5 matches (1 November 2015 to 11 March 2017)
 Home: 3 matches (3 times)
 Away: 4 matches (18 April 2015 to 11 March 2017)
 Longest unbeaten run
 20 matches (21 March 2012 to 2 December 2017)
 Home: 14 matches (4 April 1976 to 10 October 1990); league only: 15 matches (4 April 1976 to 16 May 1992)
 Away: 13 matches (7 August 2011 to 20 April 2019)
 Longest streak without a win
 12 matches (3 November 1979 to 9 March 1986)
 Home: 6 matches (30 July 1989 to 8 June 1994)
 Away: 18 matches (26 February 1978 to 12 December 1993)
 Longest losing streak
 10 matches (26 November 2000 to 12 March 2005)
 Home: 5 matches (10 February 2021 to current)
 Away: 7 matches (23 November 1999 to 9 April 2005)

v. Dinamo Zagreb

 Extreme wins and defeats:
 Home win:
 In Yugoslav First League
 4–0, 1977–78, 6 May 1978
 In Croatian First Football League
 5–2, 2016–17, 18 September 2016
 4–1, 2017–18, 7 March 2018
 3–0, 2012–13, 22 September 2012
 Away win:
 In Yugoslav First League
 3–2, 1964–65, 7 March 1965
 2–1, 1980–81, 10 May 1981
 In Croatian First Football League
 2–0, 2020–21, 19 January 2021
 Home defeat:
 In Yugoslav First League
 0–3, 1963–64, 25 August 1963
 In Croatian First Football League
 2–7, 2022–23, 13 November 2022
 0–5, 2019–20, 10 November 2019
 Away defeat:
 In Yugoslav First League
 0–6, 1958–59, 21 June 1959
 In Croatian First Football League
 0–6, 2009–10, 19 September 2009
 Longest winning streak
 3 matches (22 June 1980 to 10 May 1981; 7 May 2014 to 11 July 2014)
 Home: 5 matches (10 April 1977 to 26 October 1980)
 Away: 1 match (10 times)
 Longest unbeaten run
 4 matches (5 times)
 Home: 13 matches (19 August 1964 to 27 April 1983); league only: 23 matches (19 August 1964 to 11 May 1994)
 Away: 3 matches (7 March 1999 to 6 May 2000)
 Longest streak without a win
 11 matches (6 December 1959 to 7 March 1965)
 Home: 5 matches (6 December 1959 to 22 August 1965)
 Away: 20 matches (10 May 1981 to 21 April 1999)
 Longest losing streak
 8 matches (20 July 2006 to 27 July 2008)
 Home: 4 matches (1 October 1961 to 16 August 1964)
 Away: 11 matches (3 March 1991 to 7 March 1999)

Average home league attendance record

Source: hrnogomet.com

Penalty shoot-out history 

1This was the first ever match in a well-known competition that used the penalty shootout procedure to decide a tie. 2 For three consecutive seasons (from 1988–89 to 1990–91), if a league fixture ended in a draw, penalty shoot-outs were used to determine which side will be awarded one point (the losing side did not get a point).
Sources: List of HNK Rijeka seasons, Glasilo Hrvatskog nogometnog saveza

Bibliography
 Croatian Football Statistics (www.hrnogomet.com) 
 Football in the former Yugoslavia (www.exyufudbal.in.rs)

References 

Rijeka
Records
Rijeka